Presidential elections were held in Egypt on 26 September 1999. The vote took the form of a referendum on the candidacy of Hosni Mubarak after he was nominated for the post by the People's Assembly. Mubarak was supported by all four main opposition parties, with the exception of the Nasserist Party.

His candidacy was approved by 93.8%, with voter turnout reported to be 79.2%.

Background
The People's Assembly nominated Mubarak on 2 June by a vote of 443 to zero, with 11 abstentions.

Results

References

Egypt
Egypt
Presidential
Referendums in Egypt
Single-candidate elections
Egypt